Roland Cornelis Greefkes (May 27, 1941 - August 17, 2021) is a third-generation master iron smith.

Biography 
Born in The Hague, Netherlands, he is the son of Marie Johanna Veltman Greefkes and Cornelis Greefkes, the foremost art smith in the Netherlands after World War II. He earned a degree in chemical engineering from the University of Toronto in 1968, and later spent several years traveling in the Middle East and India before returning to the Netherlands to work with his father. Upon emigrating to the United States in 1977, he worked for several years in Baltimore, then established Aesthetica, his smithy in upstate New York, bearing the same name as his late father's smithy in The Hague.

Works 

His wrought iron work is characterized by strong representations of nature, freely interpreted in his own style, yet rooted in his father's Art Deco influence. To quote an article by Lee Fleming in Garden Design Magazine,
"Although schooled in the design traditions of the past, Greefkes finds inspiration in the evanescent drama of the natural world that surrounds his forge. ... His designs are dynamic; the natural world they mirror is active, evolving, and often filled with humorous visual anecdotes." (September/October, 1993)

Some of his major works are a driveway gate for Yoko Ono, a firescreen for Bette Midler, firescreens for Blythe Danner and Bruce Paltrow, and a table for Eagles guitarist Don Felder. His "Paradise Gate", an intricate garden gate commissioned by Australian fantasy writer Sara Douglass, is installed in her garden in Tasmania.  His liturgical wrought iron pieces are in several churches up and down the East Coast of the United States.

References
Meilach, Dona Z.; The Contemporary Blacksmith (Schiffer, 2000);
Meilach, Dona Z.; Fireplace Accessories (Schiffer, 2002);
Garden Design, September/October 1993;
Garden Design, 2003;
House and Garden, November 1990;
Kaatskill Life, Summer 2006 &
New York Times, July 17, 1989.

Further reading 
 Wrought iron
 Ornamental metal

External links
Yoko One

1941 births
Living people
Dutch artists
American artists
Dutch emigrants to the United States
Artists from The Hague
American blacksmiths